Jennings Promontory is a prominent rock promontory on the eastern margin of Amery Ice Shelf between the Branstetter Rocks and Kreitzer Glacier. It was delineated in 1952 by John H. Roscoe from air photos taken by U.S. Navy Operation Highjump (1946–47), and named by him for Lieutenant Joe C. Jennings, U.S. Navy, co-pilot and navigator on Operation Highjump photographic flights in this area.

References

Promontories of Antarctica
Landforms of Mac. Robertson Land
Ingrid Christensen Coast